Ven a Mi is the fifth studio album by Latin rap group Barrio Boyzz. It was released in 1997 through SBK Records.

Track listing 
"Rico" 
"No Quiero Verte Llorar"
"Tu Manera de Amar"
"Es Cosa del Amor"
"Depende de Ti"
"Se Me Fue Mi Vida (A Duo con Rikarena)"
"Ven a Mi"
"Entre los Dos"
"Sere Tu Rio (I'll Be Your River)"
"Loquera"
"Si Eres Tu"

Barrio Boyzz albums
1997 albums